Boris Equestri, known professionally as Boris Way, is a French DJ and record producer. He is best known for his 2017 song "Your Love" which charted in France at 87th.

Early life and career

Equestri was born in Draguignan and spent his childhood in Cavalaire-sur-Mer. He played in rock bands in his early life and as a teenager, he played the guitar and the drums after having discovered his interest in clubbing. His career began as a disc jockey in clubs of Nice, which is the city he settled in. He performed at the Mas d'Estel beach area as a guest of fellow French DJ and producer Kungs, at the Summer Vibes festival in Saint-Aygulf as a guest of deep house duo Ofenbach and at Amnesia as a guest of his friend Quentin Mosimann.

Being resident DJ at L'Étoile, he began producing music and sent them to record labels before releasing two singles, "Sunday" and "Come Fire", with Spinnin' Records. He later signed a contract with Parlophone of Warner Music and released the single "Your Love". The song featured vocalist Tom Bailey, who was from the same publishing company as Equestri. The song was created when Bailey sent him a demo, which was eventually signed by Warner and was sent for radio airplay.

Discography

Charted singles

References

Deep house musicians
Future house musicians
Progressive house musicians
Spinnin' Records artists
Armada Music artists
Musicians from Nice
French DJs
French electronic musicians
French record producers
Electronic dance music DJs